K Centauri is a possible binary star in the southern constellation of Centaurus. It has a white hue and is bright enough to be visible to the naked eye, having an apparent visual magnitude of +5.04.

K Centauri is located at a distance of approximately 410 light years from the Sun based on parallax, and it has an absolute magnitude of −0.91. This is an ordinary A-type main-sequence star with a stellar classification of A1V. It is spinning rapidly with a projected rotational velocity of 220 km/s, which is giving it a pronounced equatorial bulge that is 25% larger than the polar radius.

Analysis of Hipparcos and Gaia astrometry suggests that the relatively large margins of error in the calculated parallax may be due to orbital motion caused by an unseen companion.

References 

A-type main-sequence stars
Centaurus (constellation)
Centauri, K
Durchmusterung objects
117150
065810
5071